MZW is an album by Swedish singer and model Måns Zelmerlöw

MZW or mzw may also refer to
Deg language, a Gurunsi language spoken in Ghana and the Ivory Coast. (ISO 639-3: mzw)
Manjhwe railway station, Bihar, India (station code: MZW)
Mécheria Airport, a military airport near Mécheria, Algeria (IATA: MZW)

See also
TW73, a teargas grenade gun developed in Switzerland, now called the Mehrzweckwerfer (General Purpose Thrower) MZW 73/91